The State Supervisory Commission for Flight Safety (Gosavianadzor, Госавианадзор СССР) was an agency of the government of the Soviet Union, under the Council of Ministers. The agency investigated aviation accidents and incidents. After the breakup of the Soviet Union in 1991, the former Soviet republics that joined the Commonwealth of Independent States formed the Interstate Aviation Committee (IAC or MAK), the successor to the Gosavianadzor.

References

External links
"Accident and Incident Investigation In Soviet Practice." (Archive) Flight Safety Digest. Flight Safety Foundation. January 1992. p. 1. Prepared by the Gosavianadzor.
"Госавианадзор CCCH."  Academic.ru. 

Government of the Soviet Union
Soviet Union
Soviet Union
Organizations investigating aviation accidents and incidents
Aviation in the Soviet Union
Transport safety organizations
Transport organizations based in the Soviet Union